Yanaqucha (Quechua yana black, very dark, qucha lake, "black lake", hispanicized spelling Yanacocha) is a lake in Peru; it is located in the Ayacucho Region, Huanta Province, Huamanguilla District.

References 

Lakes of Peru
Lakes of Ayacucho Region